Montgomery Bernard "Monty" Alexander OJ (born 6 June 1944) is a Jamaican jazz pianist. His playing has a Caribbean influence and bright swinging feeling, with a strong vocabulary of bebop jazz and blues rooted melodies. He was influenced by Louis Armstrong, Duke Ellington, Erroll Garner, Nat King Cole, Oscar Peterson, Ahmad Jamal, Les McCann, and Frank Sinatra. Alexander also sings and plays the melodica. He is known for his surprising musical twists, bright rhythmic sense, and intense dramatic musical climaxes. Monty's recording career has covered many of the well-known American songbook standards, jazz standards, pop hits, and Jamaican songs from his original homeland. Alexander has resided in New York City for many years and performs frequently throughout the world at jazz festivals and clubs.

Biography
Alexander was born on 6 June 1944 in Kingston, Jamaica. He discovered the piano when he was four years old and seemed to have a knack for picking melodies out by ear. His mother sent him to classical music lessons at the age of six and he became interested in jazz piano at the age of 14.  He began playing in clubs, and on recording sessions by Clue J & His Blues Blasters, subbing for Aubrey Adams, whom he describes as his hero, when he was unable to play. Two years later, he directed a dance orchestra (Monty and the Cyclones) and played in the local clubs covering much of the 1960s early rock and pop dance hits. Performances at the Carib Theater in Jamaica by Louis Armstrong and Nat King Cole left a strong impression on the young pianist.

Alexander and his family moved to Miami, Florida, in 1961, where he played in various nightclubs. One night Monty was brought to the attention of Frank Sinatra and Frank's friend Jilly Rizzo. They were there to see the act in the next room, a Sinatra imitator. Somebody suggested they also check out the kid playing piano in the front room bar, "He's swinging the room pretty good" they said. Thus, Monty was invited to New York City in 1962 to become the house pianist for Jilly Rizzo's night club and restaurant simply called "Jilly's." In addition to performing with Frank Sinatra there, Alexander also met and became friends with bassist Ray Brown and vibist Milt Jackson. He also became friendly with Miles Davis, both men sharing a love of watching boxing matches.

In Los Angeles, in 1964, Alexander recorded his first album, Alexander the Great, for Pacific Jazz at the age of 20. The album was very energetic and upbeat with the climax tune being "Blues for Jilly".

Alexander recorded with Milt Jackson in 1969, with Ernest Ranglin in 1974 and in Europe the same year with Ed Thigpen. He toured regularly in Europe and recorded there, mostly with his classic trio for MPS Records. He also toured around 1976 with the steelpan player Othello Molineaux. 

In the mid-1970s he formed a group consisting of John Clayton on bass and Jeff Hamilton on drums, creating a stir on the jazz-scene in Europe. Their most famous collaboration is Montreux Alexander, recorded during the Montreux Jazz Festival in July 1976.

A year later in 1977 Alexander recorded again with Milt Jackson on the LP called Soul Fusion.  Jackson used Alexander's trio (with bassist John Clayton and drummer Jeff Hamilton, future big-band co-leaders) for the Pablo recorded LP which was later issued on CD through Original Jazz Classics. Much of the material is obscure (including Jackson's three originals), with Stevie Wonder's "Isn't She Lovely" being the only jazz standard on the album.

Alexander has also played with several singers such as Ernestine Anderson, Mary Stallings and other important leaders (Dizzy Gillespie, Benny Golson, Jimmy Griffin and Frank Morgan). In his successive trios, he has played frequently with musicians associated with Oscar Peterson: Herb Ellis, Ray Brown, Mads Vinding, Ed Thigpen and Niels-Henning Ørsted Pedersen.

Alexander formed a reggae band in the 1990s, featuring all Jamaican musicians. He has released several reggae albums, including Yard Movement (1996), Stir It Up (1999, a collection of Bob Marley songs), Monty Meets Sly & Robbie (2000), and Goin' Yard (2001). He collaborated again with Ranglin in 2004 on the album Rocksteady.

Alexander married the American jazz guitarist Emily Remler in 1981. They divorced in 1985. Alexander is currently married to Italian jazz singer Caterina Zapponi.

Awards and honors
 Musgrave Medal, Institute of Jamaica, 2000
 Best Live Performance Album, Independent Music Awards, Harlem-Kingston Express, 2012
 Grammy-nominated 2011 CD, Harlem-Kingston Express
 2014 Soul Train Award-nominated followup, Harlem-Kingston Express, Vol. 2: The River Rolls On, both released on Motéma Records

Discography

As leader

Compilations

As sideman
With Ernest Ranglin
 Ranglypso (MPS, 1974)
 Below the Bassline (Island, 1996)
 Rocksteady (Telarc, 2004)
 Order of Distinction (Milk River Music, 2009)

With Milt Jackson
 That's the Way It Is (Impulse!, 1969)
 Just the Way It Had to Be (Impulse!, 1969)
 Soul Fusion (Pablo, 1977)
 Montreux '77 (Pablo, 1977)
 A London Bridge (Pablo, 1982)
 Mostly Duke (Pablo, 1982)
 Memories of Thelonious Sphere Monk (Pablo, 1982)

With Ray Brown
 Live at the Concord Jazz Festival (Concord, 1979)
 Summerwind (Jeton, 1981) 2LP
 A Ray Brown 3 (Concord, 1983)
 Ray Brown, Monty Alexander, & Russell Malone (Telarc, 2002)
 Walk On (Telarc, 2003)

With Tony Bennett
 A Swingin' Christmas (Featuring The Count Basie Big Band) (Columbia, 2008)

With others
 1969 The Original Jam Sessions 1969, Quincy Jones and Bill Cosby
 1971 Smackwater Jack, Quincy Jones
 1977 Dizzy Gillespie Montreux Jam, Dizzy Gillespie
 1979 Somewhere in My Lifetime, Phyllis Hyman
 1980 Royal Blue, Marshal Royal
 1980 Never Make Your Move Too Soon, Ernestine Anderson
 1982 Goal, Dieter Goal
 1986 Go for Whatcha' Know, Jimmy Smith
 1987 Spontaneous Combustion, Barney Kessel
 1989 Chicken Scratch, Lee "Scratch" Perry
 1990 Snowy Morning Blues, Howard Alden
 1991 Unforgettable: With Love, Natalie Cole
 1994 That's Funky, Benny Golson
 1994 Hi-Bop Ska!, The Skatalites
 1996 Landmarks, Clifton Anderson
 1996 Manhattan Moods, Mary Stallings
 1996 Verve Jazz Masters #59, Toots Thielemans
 2000 One on One, Clark Terry
 2000 That's Funky, Benny Golson
 2001 Universal Lovesongs, Caterina Zapponi
 2002 Kristian Jørgensen Meets Monty Alexander, Kristian Jørgensen
 2003 Tribute to Charlie Parker, Frank Morgan
 2004 With All My Heart, Harvey Mason
 2005 In the Rhythm, Suzanne Couch
 2006 Chuck Redd Remembers Barney Kessel: Happy All the Time, Chuck Redd
 2010 Back in the Saddle Again, Bucky Pizzarelli
 2010 You Are There: Duets, Hilary Kole
 2011 Kaiso, Etienne Charles
 2011 Man With the Hat, Grace Kelly/Phil Woods

Filmography
 Al Di Meola, Stanley Clarke, Jean-Luc Ponty – Live at Montreux (1994)
 New Morning – The Paris Concert (2008)

See also 
 List of jazz pianists

References

External links 

 Official website
 Images of Monty Alexander, digitized photographs from the James Arkatov Collection at UCLA Library Special Collections.
 New England Jazz History Database Audio Interviews

1944 births
Musicians from Kingston, Jamaica
American jazz pianists
American male pianists
Melodica players
Chesky Records artists
MPS Records artists
Pausa Records artists
Living people
Jamaican jazz pianists
Recipients of the Musgrave Medal
20th-century American pianists
21st-century American pianists
20th-century American male musicians
21st-century American male musicians
American male jazz musicians
Black & Blue Records artists
Motéma Music artists